Saturnia walterorum, or Walter's saturnia moth, is a species of silkmoth in the family Saturniidae. It is found in Central America and North America.

The MONA or Hodges number for Saturnia walterorum is 7752.

References

Further reading

 
 
 

walterorum
Articles created by Qbugbot
Moths described in 1958